The Suffering of God: An Old Testament Perspective is a book by Old Testament scholar Terence E. Fretheim.  In 1984 it appeared as number 14 in the Overtures to Biblical Theology series published by Fortress Press.

Summary and review 

Most Christians believe the incarnation of God is an exclusively New Testament idea, but in The Suffering of God: An Old Testament Perspective, Terence E. Fretheim argues that incarnation has always been God's standard method of interaction with humanity.  Through exegesis and a literary and philosophical approach to Scripture, Fretheim draws the elusive God of the Old Testament close.  Indeed, the author seeks to balance the common images of God as wrathful judge or cold lawgiver with an image of God in relationship with humanity.  According to Fretheim, God suffers because He has completely and intimately bound Himself in relation to the created world, especially His people Israel.

Fretheim defends his thesis by claiming that "metaphors matter" and appealing to biblical images of an immanent deity.   For him, the most significant metaphors for God in the Old Testament are anthropomorphic.  If man is created in the image of God, he argues, then we have "permission to reverse the process and, by looking at the human, learn what God is like" (p. 11).  The human metaphor is presented as the dominant expression of God's nature and character.  The author says that many aspects of humanity are not appropriate for describing God.  Sexuality, death, sinfulness, etc. are aspects of human nature that should not be ascribed to God.  These "ungodly" aspects of humanity have moved some Christians to dismiss anthropomorphic descriptions of God out of hand, but Fretheim argues that the human metaphor is so pervasive and appropriate that it acts as a sort of guide, directing the reader as to the proper way to understand all non-human metaphors.

The human metaphor has been long neglected in Fretheim's opinion, but he sees feminist theology, liberation / Black theology, and the theological response to catastrophic events of the twentieth century as positive responses to this neglect.  The problem, he says, is that too many theologians are doing their own exegesis, and they are bringing ideas to the text which cannot be supported.  He argues that biblical scholars, biased by their theology, have largely ignored texts concerning God's repentance, downplayed anthropomorphic descriptions of God, and misunderstood issues relating to divine foreknowledge.  Fretheim believes that an unbiased view will be more pluralistic and more willing to incorporate the relational aspects of the Old Testament God.

Summary 

The first traditional view that Fretheim seeks to undermine, or perhaps more accurately to bring balance to, is the idea of divine transcendence.  He argues that both the monarchical and organismic views are present in scripture, but that the organismic, immanent image is dominant.  This “relationship of reciprocity” (p. 35) between God and the world is the foundation for all of Fretheim's conclusions.   God affects and is affected by the world He has created, and this relationship is key to understanding what kind of God He is.

The second widely held position that Fretheim challenges is the doctrine of divine omniscience. (chapter 4) Fretheim uses solid biblical exegesis to argue compellingly against a view (at least in the Old Testament) which classifies omniscience as one of God's fundamental characteristics. Divine foreknowledge, he believes, is limited because of God's relationship with creation.  There is no doubt, he says, that God always knows what He will do in the future, but He does not always know what free moral agents outside of Himself will do.  For Fretheim, the widespread use of  words like “perhaps” and “if” in divine speech point to a lack of certainty in God's mind about the future.  God's bargain with Abraham over Sodom is an excellent example of God's mind being open to change depending on the unforeseen actions of human beings.  The issue of foreknowledge is not presented as complex or difficult.  Rather, Fretheim quickly lays out his argument and in less than fifteen pages and moves on to the addresses the issue of God's presence in the world. (chapter 5) While acknowledging that God is everywhere at all times in a structural or general presence, Fretheim describes what he calls, the “intensification of the divine presence.”  This intensity of presence can be affected positively or negatively by human beings.  Fretheim argues that sin drives away God (as in Ezekiel 8:6) and actually results in the intensification of divine presence in the form of God's wrath.  Conversely, righteousness or “receptiveness” can move God to draw near.

The most intense experience of God's presence occurs in the form of theophany.  In what is probably Fretheim's most controversial chapter (chapter 6), he describes the appearances of God in the Old Testament and the human reaction to them.  To Fretheim, the spoken word delivered by God is no more important than the appearance itself, the visible word, as he calls it.  He suggests that modern theologians need to broaden their understanding of the Word of God to include the visual aspects of revelation as well as the spoken/written word.
Fretheim makes a thorough examination of several different Old Testament theophanies noting their similarities and differences before coming to his surprising conclusion:  All theophanies involve God taking on human form (chapter 6).  Theologically, this is key for Fretheim.  The consistent use of human form shows God's vulnerability.  It proves that there is nothing fundamentally ungodly about the human form, and it shows that “the finite form is capable of the infinite.” (p. 102)  In wrestling with the theological implications of such a statement, Fretheim questions whether God uses the human form for the sake of appearances or whether there is a fundamental continuity between the two.  Not surprisingly, he argues for the latter position, and from the argument establishes that God is fundamentally connected to His creation and that He is fundamentally vulnerable because of this relationship.  This leads to his actual discussion of the suffering of God.

In three short chapters Fretheim describes God as suffering because of His creation (chapter 7), for His creation (chapter 8), and with His creation (chapter 9) .  These chapters flow logically out of the groundwork established in the first one hundred pages of the text.  Each chapter is neatly summarized in numbered points making it easy to review and synthesize.
The final chapter of Fretheim's book deals with the special relationship between the suffering God and His suffering servants, the prophets.  In men like Jeremiah, the divine word is incarnated to the point that the prophet shares in the divine suffering and God shares in the prophets suffering. The lives of the prophets are tied up in the divine life to the point that they embody the word of God in their lives as well as their words.  The suffering servant in Isaiah experiences the same phenomenon as prophets like Moses and Jeremiah, but in him, Fretheim sees another level intensification of presence.  Despite his strong claims about the shared suffering of the prophets and God, Fretheim acknowledges that in the Old Testament God Himself did not become completely incarnate in an entire human life.  That act is reserved for the incarnation of Jesus Christ, but Fretheim sees it, not as something radically new, but as “the culmination of a long-standing relationship of God with the world that is much more widespread in the OT than is commonly recognized.”

Fretheim's work is incredibly successful at accomplishing its stated purpose of bringing balance to the church's image of God in the Old Testament.  He powerfully synthesizes the work of feminist, liberation, and process theologians while relying firmly on his expertise as a biblical exegete.   The real strength of this work is that Fretheim manages to make many of the same critiques common to these movements without sounding like a feminist or a liberation theologian.  While he acknowledges their influence on him, the author's tone and focus remain overtly biblical throughout the book.

Fretheim brings an air of authority and experience in the task of exegesis that is missing in the works of systematic theologians addressing the same issues.   Influences like Abraham Heschel help him keep Christian bias to a minimum when approaching the Old Testament text.   Furthermore, he does not limit himself to one or two proof texts to support his position.  On the contrary, I found myself flipping through my Bible constantly while reading his work.  He challenges the reader to draw theology from the biblical text rather than to allow our preconceived ideas about God to distort our reading of the Old Testament.
Fretheim's book is a marvelous example of inductive logical organization and rational approach to a complex topic.  His argument is well-formed and easy to follow.  The reader may be confused as to why a book called The Suffering of God takes over one hundred pages to actually discuss any pain endured by the deity, but Fretheim is not rushed into embracing a position before laying the biblical and philosophical groundwork necessary to support that position.   Indeed, laying the foundation is the difficult part.  After chapter six, the reader already anticipates the conclusion.

The author is conversant with a wide range of modern scholarship as evidenced by his excellent endnotes and bibliography.   The relative brevity of the book is amazing considering the wide range of topics addressed.  Here again, Fretheim's organizational skills are at work.  When a related but unessential issue arises, he usually adds a note to refer the reader to good sources on the topic and continues on without interrupting his argument.
One of the nicest things about this work is its energetic and engaging style.  Fretheim hopes this book will change the church's view of God in the Old Testament, and readability is essential to influencing preachers and teachers within churches.  The provocative nature of the topic and Fretheim's willingness to make bold claims leads the reader into dialogue with the text.  Ward characterizes it as “bold and challenging, inviting vigorous response,” saying that the margins of his review copy are “filled with comments”   While the content is too technical for direct use in most church settings, the ideas that Fretheim lays out can easily be transferred to a sermon or Bible class.  Certainly, The Suffering of God is not a popular level book, but it is also not so technical as to exclude ministers or seminary students from its audience.

Critiques 
While reviews have been very positive, they have raised three serious critiques of the work.  First, in his effort to emphasize the imminent and relational nature of God, Fretheim neglects to adequately address themes like holiness as a balance to his relational theology.  Without the tension provided by God's holiness, relational theology can be pushed too far, and Fretheim sometimes is guilty of this.   Dale Patrick points out that while Fretheim does not deny that much of the God-talk in the Old Testament does fit into the traditional paradigms which emphasize holiness, sovereignty, and transcendence he ignores these elements claiming that the organismic is predominant.  Patrick argues that the task of biblical theology is to present a comprehensive image of God rather than simply a prominent one.   Some have claimed that Fretheim's process theology (a term Fretheim himself never embraces) is to blame for the lack of material on holiness.   However, given Fretheim's presupposition that transcendence and sovereignty have been overemphasized, it is easy to see why he doesn't spend time affirming them.  His stated goal is not to replace ideas of holiness, but to bring balance to them.
As previously stated, Fretheim uses a wide variety of texts to support his position, but the vast majority of these come from the Psalms and the prophetic literature.  As Elizabeth Bellefontaine notes, Israel's wisdom traditions are conspicuously absent.   Despite his heavy criticism of those who “remove certain materials from the OT theological repertoire” for the purposes of theological convergence (p. 20), Fretheim himself offers a nod to the wisdom literature and then completely ignores it.  This would be less relevant were it not for the fact that much of the wisdom literature stands in tension if not opposition to his own theology.

While Fretheim's catch phrase, “Metaphors matter,” can be universally affirmed, he is sometimes guilty of thinking that they matter too much.  This leads him at time to engage in an overly literal reading of scripture.  Metaphors reveal God to us, but they are not God himself.  “The modern interpreter’s challenge, which is not adequately confronted in this book, is to discern how the Old Testament understood its metaphors.”    He overstates his case when discussing incarnational metaphor and theodicy.   White says, “There is no need for Fretheim to argue (as he does) that all theophanies were in human form in order to substantiate the interrelationship between theophanic motif and the prophet.” Saying that a human figure can be inferred within the pillar of cloud or the burning bush (p. 94–95) is speculative at best, and Fretheim doesn't need it to advance his argument.

Published reviews 

 Bellefontaine, Elizabeth. Review of The Suffering of God: An Old Testament Perspective, by Terence E. Fretheim. Horizons 13 (Spring 1986): 151–153.
 Harr, Murray J. Review of The Suffering of God: An Old Testament Perspective, by Terence E. Fretheim. Theology Today 42 (April 1985):  140–142.
 Luker, Lamontte. Review of The Suffering of God: An Old Testament Perspective, by Terence E. Fretheim. Currents in Theology and Mission 12 (December 1985) 376–378.
 Patrick, Dale. Review of The Suffering of God: An Old Testament Perspective, by Terence E. Fretheim. Word and World 5 (Fall 1985): 444–445.
 Theiss, Norman. Review of The Suffering of God: An Old Testament Perspective, by Terence E. Fretheim. Interpretation 40, no. 1 (January 1986):  81–82.
 Ward, James M. Review of The Suffering of God: An Old Testament Perspective, by Terence E. Fretheim. Journal of Biblical Literature 105, no. 3 (Summer 1986): 516–518.
 White, John B. Review of The Suffering of God: An Old Testament Perspective, by Terence E. Fretheim. Journal of the American Academy of Religion 54, no. 3 (Fall 1986): 578–579.

See also 
 Abraham Joshua Heschel
 Jürgen Moltmann
 Kazoh Kitamori

1984 non-fiction books
Religious studies books
1984 in religion